Numerische Mathematik is a peer-reviewed mathematics journal on numerical analysis. It was established in 1959 and is published by Springer Science+Business Media. The journal is indexed by Mathematical Reviews and Zentralblatt MATH. Its 2009 MCQ was 1.06, and its 2020 impact factor was 2.223.

References

External links

Mathematics journals
Publications established in 1959
English-language journals
Springer Science+Business Media academic journals
Monthly journals